Henry Fell Pease (28 April 1838 – 6 December 1896) was a coal and ironstone mine-owner from North East England and a Liberal politician who represented Cleveland.

Pease, a member of the prominent Quaker Pease family, was born at Middleton St. George, near Darlington, the eldest son of Henry Pease and his wife Anna Fell, daughter of Richard Fell of Uxbridge.

He was educated privately.

He became a partner in  the family firm of Pease and Partners (Limited), who owned coal and ironstone mines and was also a director of the Stockton and Darlington Railway Co.

When Darlington was incorporated as a borough in 1868 he became a councillor, and was twice mayor of Darlington in 1874–75 and in 1894.

In 1881 and 1882, he was president of the National Liberal Federation.

He was a J.P. for County Durham and the North Riding of Yorkshire.

Pease was elected as MP for Cleveland in 1885 as a Liberal and held the seat until his death at the age of 58 at Brinkburn, Darlington.
 
In 1862, Pease married his second cousin, Elizabeth Pease, eldest daughter of John Beaumont Pease, of North Lodge, Darlington. They had four sons and one daughter.

See also
List of political families in the United Kingdom

References

External links
Durham County Council portrait of Henry Fell Pease 

1838 births
1896 deaths
Liberal Party (UK) MPs for English constituencies
Mayors of places in North East England
Presidents of the Liberal Party (UK)
UK MPs 1885–1886
UK MPs 1886–1892
UK MPs 1892–1895
UK MPs 1895–1900
Henry Fell